Cesini is an Italian surname.

Notable people with the surname include: 
 Carlo Cesini 
 Davide Cesini (born 1988), Italian water polo player
 Gianni Cesini (born 1948), Italian physicist
 Luciano Cesini (born 1948), Italian football coach and player
 Matteo Cesini 
 Riccardo Cesini, Italian water polo player, brother of Davide Cesini

References

Italian-language surnames